F&M Bank Arena is the planned new arena for the Austin Peay Governors men's and women's basketball teams of the ASUN Conference. Located in Clarksville, Tennessee, it will be able to seat around 6,000 people. In addition to the main space which will hold events such as APSU's basketball games, concerts, banquets, conventions, and many other events; there will be a second floor of F&M Bank Arena that will mainly be used for figure and youth skating. Replacing Winfield Dunn Center, whose basketball arena will be converted to a volleyball-specific facility, both the men's and women's basketball teams will move from Winfield Dunn Center to the new arena. The facility will include locker rooms, coaches' offices, and training rooms for both teams.

History
Montgomery County Mayor Jim Durrett had a vision for Downtown Clarksville and in November 2019, the Montgomery County Commission approved funding for the new multi-purpose event center. However, no bonds for paying for the arena would be signed until Austin Peay signed to be the main tenant and the Nashville Predators signed to manage the facility. The new arena will feature two ice rinks, space for concerts and events, as well as a practice gym for Austin Peay Men and Women's Basketball.

Groundbreaking was held on November 12, 2020, which was attended by Mayor Durrett, Clarksville Mayor Joe Pitts, as well as officials with the Nashville Predators, and the CEO of F&M Bank.

Sabertooth Sports and Entertainment, which is owned by the Nashville Predators, will be the operators of the arena. On July 30, 2021, F&M Bank officially agreed to a naming rights deal for the Arena.

As of August 9, 2022, the arena is expected to be completed by January 2023, with the arena officially opening in July 2023.

The Arena is part of a bigger project to bring more life to downtown Clarksville. Across the street from the arena, a new three-story restaurant development is being built. Set to be built behind the arena is Riverview Square, which will consist of restaurants and shops, as well as renovation of the Riverview Inn, which will become a DoubleTree by Hilton hotel. A parking garage is also planned to be built with this development as well.

On March 10, 2023, the first ever goal on the ice rink was scored by Columbus Capitals 2011A Defensemen Henry Mahaffey. A blue line wrist shot that was deflected off the goalie.

References

Basketball venues in Tennessee
College basketball venues in the United States
Austin Peay Governors basketball
Figure skating clubs in the United States
Indoor arenas under construction in the United States
Proposed sports venues in the United States
2023 establishments in the United States